A Day at the Beach is the second album by the Chicago-based rock, soul, and rhythm and blues group Sonia Dada, released in 1995. It was produced by the band.

Critical reception
The Philadelphia Daily News wrote that Sonia Dada "serves up rock, gospel, doo-wop, soul and R&B ... This means either they're eclectic, or they're groping." The Indianapolis Star deemed the album "a frothy arena-band sound with simply nice vocals, something you might get by mixing Toto and the Little River Band."

Track listing
Sources: Official Site, AllMusic

References

1995 albums
Capricorn Records albums
Sonia Dada albums